Helta is a town in North Lebanon.

People from Helta
Elias Peter Hoayek (1843–1931)
Saadallah Howayek  (1853–)
Youssef Howayek (1883–1962) 

Populated places in the North Governorate
Batroun District
Maronite Christian communities in Lebanon